Ali Arab (also Romanized as ‘Alī ‘Arab) is a village in Kabutarsorkh Rural District, in the Central District of Chadegan County, Isfahan Province, Iran. At the 2006 census, its population was 1,023, in 217 families.

References 

Populated places in Chadegan County